Sakht Sar Rural District is a rural district (dehestan) in the Central District of Ramsar County, Mazandaran Province, Iran. At the 2006 census, its population was 6,305, in 1,795 families. The rural district has 56 villages.

References 

Rural Districts of Mazandaran Province
Ramsar County